"We Can Talk" is a 1968 song by The Band that was the opener for the second side of their debut album Music From Big Pink Written by Richard Manuel, it features The Band's three main vocalists (Manuel, Levon Helm and Rick Danko) in nearly equal turns, often finishing each other's phrases. Initially a staple of their concerts (including Woodstock and the Isle of Wight Festival 1969), it was dropped from the set list in 1971.

Theme 
"We Can Talk" shows unrelated snippets of conversation between members of The Band. Levon Helm wrote in his autobiography "It's a funny song that really captures the way we spoke to one another; lots of outrageous rhymes and corny puns."

Personnel 

Robbie Robertson - electric guitar
Garth Hudson - Lowrey organ
Levon Helm - lead vocal, drums
Richard Manuel - lead vocal, piano
Rick Danko - lead vocal, bass guitar

References

External links 
 http://theband.hiof.no/albums/music_from_big_pink.html
 http://theband.hiof.no/articles/we_can_talk_viney.html

The Band songs
Song recordings produced by John Simon (record producer)
Songs written by Richard Manuel
1968 songs